Eugene Norman Brodhagen (October 28, 1917 – June 13, 1986) was an American football and wrestling coach. He served two stints as the head football coach at Winona State University in Winona, Minnesota from 1946 to 1950 and again from 1952 to 1954, compiling a record of 19–38–3. Brodhagen played college football at the University of Wisconsin, lettering from 1936 to 1938.

Brodhagen was born on October 28, 1917 in Bonduel, Wisconsin. He began his coaching career in 1939 as an assistant football coach Grinnell College in Grinnell, Iowa, working under head football coach at Guy Lookabaugh. In 1940, he was named head of the athletic department at Phillips High School in Phillips, Wisconsin, where coached football, basketball, and baseball.

Brodhagen served in the United States Navy during World War II, from February 1943 until his discharge in 1945. He remained in the United States Naval Reserve until 1976, when he retired as a lieutentenant commander. He died unexpectedly on June 13, 1986, at his cottage near Tomahawk, Wisconsin.

Head coaching record

College football

References

External links
 UW–Stevens Point Hall of Fame profile
 

1917 births
1986 deaths
Grinnell Pioneers football coaches
Winona State Warriors football coaches
Wisconsin Badgers football players
Wisconsin–Stevens Point Pointers football coaches
College track and field coaches in the United States
College wrestling coaches in the United States
High school baseball coaches in the United States
High school basketball coaches in Wisconsin
High school football coaches in Wisconsin
United States Navy personnel of World War II
United States Navy officers
People from Shawano, Wisconsin
Coaches of American football from Wisconsin
Players of American football from Wisconsin
Baseball coaches from Wisconsin
Basketball coaches from Wisconsin
Military personnel from Wisconsin